Lokma is a dessert made of leavened and deep fried dough balls, soaked in syrup or honey, sometimes coated with cinnamon or other ingredients. The dish was described as early as the 13th century by al-Baghdadi as  luqmat al-qādi, "judge's morsels".

Etymology
The Arabic word  (plural ), means morsel, mouthful, or bite. The Turkish name for the dish, is derived from the Arabic, as is the Greek name .

History 

The recipe for Luqmat al-Qadi, yeast-leavened dough boiled in oil and doused in honey or sugar syrup with rosewater, dates back to at least the early medieval period and the 13th-century Abbasid Caliphate, where it is mentioned in several of the existent cookery books of the time. It is also mentioned in the One Thousand and One Nights, in the story The Porter and the Three Ladies of Baghdad. The explorer and scholar Ibn Battuta in the 14th century encountered the dish he knew as Luqaymat al-Qadi at a dinner in Multan, during his travels in medieval India, where his hosts called it al-Hashimi.

It was cooked by palace cooks in the Ottoman Empire for centuries and influenced by other countries cuisines of the former countries of the Ottoman Empire in the Balkans, Middle East, and the Caucasus.

Preparation 

The thick and smooth yeast batter rises and has a very soft and foamy consistency.  The batter is usually dropped into hot oil and fried to a golden brown color, but some are doughnut-shaped. Lokma are served with honey and, occasionally, cinnamon.

Traditionally, the batter was leavened with yeast but modern variations sometimes use baking powder.

Regional varieties

Arab countries

Today, in Iraq it is called lokma or luqaymat and they differ both in size and taste across the country. While in Arab countries of the Persian Gulf, luqaymat, sometimes spiced with cardamom or saffron, are little changed from the 13th-century recipes. They are traditionally included in times of religious observances; for example in the Levant by Muslims at Ramadan, Jews at Hanukkah, and Christians at Epiphany alike.

Cyprus

They are commonly served spiced with cinnamon in a honey syrup and can be sprinkled lightly with powdered sugar.

Greece
The dish called  is a mainstay of Greek cooking, in particular in the south of Greece, and is a popular street food served with any combination of honey, cinnamon, walnuts and chocolate sauce.
Its original name in ancient Greek literature is "honey tokens", and, according to Callimachus, they were given as small gifts (charisioi) to the victors of the Olympic games.

In Byzantine times the pastry was likely called spongoi or sfongoi from the ancient Greek word for sponge,  [] or  [] in Ionian dialect, which is also the origin of the Arabic  (isfanj).

This term was also used by the Romaniotes (Greek Jews) as the name for loukoumades., who call them zvingoi, and make them as Hanukkah treats.

Pontic Greeks who migrated from the Black Sea as a result of the Lausanne Conference call them tsirichta.Tsirichta are served at Pontian weddings.

Turkey

There are different types of lokma in Turkey. Dessert lokma are made with flour, sugar, yeast and salt, fried in oil and later bathed in syrup or honey.  In some regions of Turkey lokma are eaten with cheese, similar to breakfast bagels. İzmir lokması are doughnut shaped with a hole in the middle. The spherical one is called the Palace Lokma (Turkish: Saray lokması). In the Güdül-Ayaş regions of Ankara, there is a type of lokma known as bırtlak.

Traditionally, forty days after someone passes away, close relatives and friends of the deceased cook large quantities of lokma for neighbours and passersby. People form queues to get a plate and recite a prayer for the soul of the deceased after eating the lokma.

See also 

List of doughnuts
Bolinho de chuva
Kemal Pasha dessert
Boortsog

References

Further reading
 A.D. Alderson and Fahir İz, The Concise Oxford Turkish Dictionary, 1959.  
 Γ. Μπαμπινιώτης (Babiniotis), Λεξικό της Νέας Ελληνικής Γλώσσας, Athens, 1998

Arab cuisine
Egyptian cuisine
Levantine cuisine
Greek desserts
Kurdish cuisine
Bosnia and Herzegovina cuisine
Doughnuts
Jewish cuisine
Hanukkah foods
Turkish desserts
Pontic Greek cuisine